O Oes Gwrtheyrn Gwrtheneu (From the Age of Vortigern the Most Slender) is a fourteenth-century Welsh chronicle. The work spans the age from Vortigern to the reign of John, King of England.

References

External links
O Oes Gwrtheyrn @ Welsh Chronicles, Bangor University

Medieval Welsh literature
Welsh chronicles